A Blonde Dream is a 1932 German musical comedy film directed by Paul Martin and starring Lilian Harvey, Willy Fritsch and Willi Forst. A separate English-language version Happy Ever After was made as a co-production with Gainsborough Pictures. A French-language version was also released.

It was shot at the Babelsberg Studios in Berlin. The film's sets were designed by the art director Erich Kettelhut.

Plot
Berlin at the height of the Depression at the beginning of the 1930s. The two window cleaners from the company Blitz-Blank, Willy I and Willy II, cycle back and forth through the big city from job to job, from house to house, with a ladder and washing utensils. They get along brilliantly and only clash when both are interested in the same girl. One day the blonde Jou-Jou enters her life. You see them through the window of the American Consulate General. When Jou-Jou is about to be thrown out of the house by the gruff porter, the two stand by her side as knights.

Jou-Jou, who earns her living as a projectile in a traveling circus, dreams of a film career in America. A Mr. Merryman, rumored to be a major Hollywood mogul, once promised her a Hollywood film career for a fee of $25. The two Willys decide to help the girl. They take her home first so that she and her shaggy mongrel nicknamed Buffalo can have a roof over their heads. Both window cleaners live poorly but happily far from the city gates in the middle of a meadow - in two miserable but wildly romantic railway carriages that are looked after by an odd guy called 'Scarecrow'.

Jou-Jou is assigned a discarded express train carriage as his own accommodation. But soon it is unmistakable that both Willy I and Willy II have their eyes on the blond dream. "Scarecrow" warns Jou-Jou that her presence here threatens to severely test the friendship of the two window cleaners. When the girl reads in the newspaper that Mr. Merryman is in Berlin, the decision seems easy and she returns to Berlin. But disillusionment follows, their 'Merryman' was a swindler! But now she suddenly faces the real Mr. Merryman. And he hires Jou-Jou – and only so that he can finally get his peace from her.

Since all this damn hype about Jou-Jou and their dream of making a movie business almost destroyed Willy's friendship for both of them, Willy II bravely steps in front of the real Mr. Merryman and gives him a tongue-in-cheek tongue-in-cheek. Merryman is delighted. He could really use a guy like that who reads others the riot act and keeps annoying visitors away. From now on, Willy II is to give this speech every day as his employee - in three languages! He even releases Jou-Jou for this, who finally sinks into Willy I's arms.

Cast

References

External links

1932 musical comedy films
German musical comedy films
Films of the Weimar Republic
Films directed by Paul Martin
1930s buddy films
German multilingual films
UFA GmbH films
Films produced by Erich Pommer
Films with screenplays by Billy Wilder
German black-and-white films
Films set in Berlin
Films shot in Berlin
1932 multilingual films
1930s German-language films
1930s German films
Films shot at Babelsberg Studios